Gromeko or  Gromyko may refer to:

 Andrei Gromyko (1909–1989), Soviet Belarusian diplomat
 Gromeko family, fictional foster family of Yuri Zhivago in Doctor Zhivago by Boris Pasternak